Xinqiao is a town of Youxian District, Mianyang, Sichuan, People's Republic of China, located  northeast of the main urban area of Mianyang. , it has 2 residential communities (社区) and 12 villages under its administration.

References 

Township-level divisions of Sichuan